Labracinus cyclophthalmus, the fire-tail devil or fire-tailed dottyback, is a species of ray finned fish from the family Pseudochromidae which occurs in the Western Pacific. It occasionally makes its way into the aquarium trade.

References

External links

 

Pseudochrominae